René Mallieux (15 November 1906 – 9 June 1995) was a Belgian field hockey player who competed in the 1928 Summer Olympics.

He was born in Liège.

Mallieux was a member of the Belgian field hockey team which finished fourth in the 1928 Olympic tournament. He played two matches as forward.

References

External links
 
René Mallieux's profile at Sports Reference.com

1906 births
1995 deaths
Belgian male field hockey players
Olympic field hockey players of Belgium
Field hockey players at the 1928 Summer Olympics
Sportspeople from Liège